Walter Breda de Souza (born 25 December 1948) is a Brazilian actor and film producer. He has been a prominent voice actor in radionovelas produced in Pernambuco state. As an actor, he has appeared in TV series such as América (2005), Amores Roubados (2014), and Deus Salve o Rei (2018).

Filmography

Television

Film

References

1948 births
Living people
Male actors from Recife
Brazilian male telenovela actors
Brazilian male film actors